Proxazole is an analgesic and an anti-inflammatory drug used for functional gastrointestinal disorders.

References

Oxadiazoles
Diethylamino compounds